Reece Pass is a north–south pass just east of Mount Colombo and Richardson, in the east part of the Fosdick Mountains in the Ford Ranges, Marie Byrd Land. Discovered on aerial flights made from West Base of the United States Antarctic Service (1939–41) and visited by a biological party in 1940. Named for J.A. Reece, radio operator at West Base.

External links 
 Siddoway, Christine & Richard, Stephen & Fanning, Christopher & Luyendyk, Bruce. (2004), Origin and emplacement of a middle Cretaceous gneiss dome, Fosdick Mountains, West Antarctica, Special Paper of the Geological Society of America. 380. 267–294. 10.1130/0-8137-2380-9.267

External links 

 Reece Pass on USGS website
 Reece Pass on AADC website
 Reece Pass on SCAR website
 Reece Pass distance calculator
 Reece Pass current weather
 Long term updated weather for Reece Pass

References 

Mountain passes of Antarctica
Landforms of Marie Byrd Land